The BMW N63 is a twin-turbocharged V8 petrol engine which has been in production from 2008 to present. The N63 is the world's first production car engine to use a "hot-vee" layout, with the turbochargers located inside the "V" of the engine. It is also BMW's first turbocharged V8 engine.

The N63 replaced the BMW N62 (a naturally aspirated V8 engine) and was first used in the 2008 X6 xDrive50i.

The S63 engine is the BMW M high-performance version of the N63.

Alpina versions of the N63 are used in various F01 7 Series, F10 5 Series, G11 7 Series, G16 8 Series and G30 5 Series models.

Design 
The airflow path through the engine uses a "hot-vee" layout, where the exhaust manifolds and turbochargers are located between the cylinder banks (on the "inside" of the V8) and the intake manifolds are located on the outside of the engine. This is opposite to the traditional layout for a V8, where the intake is inside the "V" and the exhaust manifold is on the outside. The hot-vee layout reduces the width of the engine and decreases the exhaust runner length from the exhaust valves to the turbochargers. The engine uses air-to-water intercoolers, therefore improving throttle response.

Similar to the N54B30, the initial N63 (including the S63) did not use Valvetronic (variable valve lift) because its benefit of reducing of intake vacuum is not as important in turbocharged engines}. Due to the presence of turbocharging, the N63 does not use a variable-length intake manifold.

The N63 is BMW's first V8 engine to use direct injection.

2012 technical update 
In 2012, a "Technical Update" was applied to the N63, resulting in the N63TU variants (also known as N63B44O1). The main upgrade was the addition of Valvetronic. Other changes include revised turbochargers, removal of the blowoff valve, lighter pistons, forged connecting rods and crankshaft, addition of a  valve cover labyrinth oil catch/return system, new valve stem seals, revised fuel system and addition of a second coolant pump.

2016 technical update 
A second Technical Update occurred in 2016, resulting in the N63TU2 variants (also known as N63B44O2). The major changes are the use of twin-scroll turbochargers, a wider powerband and the oil/coolant heat exchanger being moved to within the "V" of the engine.

2018 technical update 
A third Technical Update was introduced in 2018. Two variants are offered: N63B44M3 and N63B44T3. N63B44M3 features improved thermal shielding for the crankcase and the cylinder head, and a new ignition system. The N63B44T3 gains higher pressure (5000psi) injectors, larger twin-scroll turbochargers, a redesigned intake manifold, and an upstream cooling radiator.

Models

N63B40A 
This smaller variant was sold in the Chinese market.

Applications:
 2012–2017 F12/F13 650i (China only,  version)
 2012–2017 F01/F02 750i/750Li (China only,  version)

N63B44O0 

Applications:
 2008– 2013 E71 X6
 2009– 2012 F01/F02 750i/750Li
 2010– 2012 F07 550i GT
 2010– 2013 F10/F11 550i
 2011– 2013 E70 X5
 2012– 2017 F12/F13 650i
 2011–2014 Wiesmann GT MF4

N63B44O1 (N63TU)

Applications:
 2013–2015 F01/F02 750i/750Li
 2013–2017 F07 550i GT
 2014–2016 F10/F11 550i
 2014–2018 F15 X5
 2014–2019 F16 X6
 2013–2018 F12/F13 650i
 2013–2019 F06 650i

N63B44O2 (N63TU2)
The second technical update resulted in peak torque being produced over a 200 rpm wider band.

Applications:
 2016–2019 G11/G12 750i/750Li sDrive/xDrive
 2017–2020 G30/G31 M550i xDrive

N63B44M3 (N63TU3)
Applications:
 2018– G05 X5 xDrive50i
 2018– G07 X7 xDrive50i

N63B44T3 (N63TU3) 
Applications:

 2018– G14/G15/G16 M850i xDrive
 2019– G11/G12 750i/750Li sDrive/xDrive
 2020– G30/G31 M550i xDrive
 2020– G05 X5 M50i
 2020– G06 X6 M50i
 2020– G07 X7 M50i
 2021– G14/G15/G16 Alpina B8 Gran Coupe
 2022– Land Rover Range Rover (L460)
 2022– Land Rover Range Rover Sport (L461)

S63 

The S63 is the BMW M version of the N63, which debuted in the BMW X6 M and was used in the BMW M5 models from 2011 to present. The S63 uses two twin-scroll turbochargers plus a pulse tuned, cross-engine exhaust manifold to keep constant exhaust pulses flowing to the turbos at every 180 degree rotation.

S63B44O0
Applications:
 2010–2013 E70 X5 M
 2010–2013 E71 X6 M
 2011–2014 Wiesman GT MF5

S63B44T1
A technical update to the S63, known as the S63B44T1, debuted on the F10 M5 sedan. This version uses Valvetronic, a 10:1 compression ratio (compared with 9.3:1 for the non-TU version) and 1.5 bar of boost (compared with 1.3). It is the first BMW M engine to use Valvetronic. The rev limit was increased from 6800 rpm to 7200 rpm.

Applications:
 2011–2017 F10 M5
 2012–2018 F12/13 M6
 2013–2018 F06 M6 Gran Coupe

S63B44T2
The S63B44T2 debuted on the 2015 X5 M and X6 M models.

Applications:
 2015–2019 F85 X5 M
 2015–2019 F86 X6 M

S63B44T3 
The S63B44T3 debuted on the 2018 M5.

Applications:
 2018–present F90 M5
 2018–present F90 M5 Competition
 2019–present F91/92/93 M8
 2019–present F91/92/93 M8 Competition
 2020–present F95 X5 M
 2020–present F95 X5 M Competition
 2020–present F96 X6 M
 2020–present F96 X6 M Competition

P63 

The P63 is the BMW Motorsport version of the N63, which debuted in the BMW M8 GTE.

Alpina 
Alpina uses a variant of the N63 engine, which was hand-assembled at the Alpina plant in Buchloe before being transported to the BMW production line.

For the 2013 model year, the Alpina engine received Valvetronic like all other N63 engines.

M1 
Applications:
2009–2012 Alpina B7 Bi-Turbo: based on the BMW F01 7 Series
2010–2011 Alpina B5 Bi-Turbo Sedan/Touring: based on the BMW F10/F11 5 Series.

M1/1 
Applications:
2012–2014 Alpina B5 Bi-Turbo Sedan/Touring: based on the BMW F10/F11 5 Series

M1/2 
Applications:
2011–2015 Alpina B6 Bi-Turbo Coupé/Cabrio: based on the BMW F12/F13 6 Series

M2, M2/1 
Applications:
2014–2015 Alpina B6 Bi-Turbo Gran Coupé: based on the BMW F06 6 Series
2012–2015 Alpina B7 Bi-Turbo: based on the BMW F01 7 Series

M2/2 
Applications:
2015 Alpina B5 Bi-Turbo Edition 50 Sedan/Touring: based on the BMW F10/F11 5 Series
2015–2016 Alpina B6 Bi-Turbo Edition 50 Coupé/Cabrio: based on the BMW F12/F13 6 Series
2016 Alpina B5 Bi-Turbo: based on the BMW F10/F11 5 Series
2016–present Alpina B6 Bi-Turbo: based on the BMW F06/F12/F13 6 Series

M5 
The Alpina engine code is N63M30A.

Applications:
2016–2019 Alpina B7 Bi-Turbo: based on the BMW G12 7 Series
2017–present Alpina B5 Bi-Turbo: based on the BMW G30/G31 5 Series

An evolution of this engine, with better power delivery, is of the N63B44T3 type.

Applications:

 2019–present Alpina B7: based on the BMW G12 7 Series
 2021–present Alpina B8: based on the BMW G16 8 Series

North American recall 
In December 2014, BMW North America released a voluntary recall ("Customer Care Package") relating to issues with timing chain stretch, fuel injectors, mass air flow sensors, crankcase vent lines, battery, engine vacuum pump, low pressure fuel sensor and revising the oil service interval.

In 2019 NHTSA addressed the multitude of issues with BMW N63 engines, various class action lawsuits in tow, and never officially declared a mass recall in regard to valve seal issues inherent in the N63 line.
https://static.nhtsa.gov/odi/tsbs/2019/MC-10163992-9999.pdf#:~:text=The%20lawsuit%20alleges%20that%20the%20Class%20Vehicles%E2%80%99%20N63,drain%20which%20can%20potentially%20cause%20premature%20battery%20failures.

See also 
 BMW
 List of BMW engines

References

N63
V8 engines
Products introduced in 2008
Gasoline engines by model